Primitive Skateboarding is a skateboard company created by professional skateboarder Paul Rodriguez, Executive Vice President Heath Brinkley,  CEO Andy Netkin, and Jubal Jones. Primitive is headquartered in Los Angeles, California.

History 
In 2008, Paul Rodriguez, Heath Brinkley, Andy Netkin, Jay Partow, and Jubal Jones founded "Primitive", a skateboard and clothing store in Encino, CA. Paul Rodriguez had been sponsored by Plan B Skateboards, but quit the team out of a desire to have more ownership and control over his career. After Paul's departure from Plan B, he printed and sold a limited run of 500 gold-foil Primitive decks, and due to the strong response, decided to launch an ongoing skateboard company, with the help of Andy and Jubal.

Ten months after Paul Rodriguez's departure from Plan B, Primitive Skateboarding was officially announced on April 10, 2014. The original team was Paul Rodriguez as a pro, with Carlos Ribeiro and Nick Tucker as amateurs.

Collaborations 
Primitive has featured a number of collaborations that featured rappers like Tupac Shakur and Notorious B.I.G. along with various anime and cartoon programs such as Dragon Ball Z, Rick and Morty, Naruto, and Sailor Moon.

Team

Professional 

 Paul Rodriguez

 Carlos Ribeiro

 Miles Silvas 

 Brian Peacock

 Spencer Hamilton

 Trent McClung

 Franky Villani

 Robert Neal

 Wade Desarmo

 Tiago Lemos

 JB Gillette

 Giovanni Vianna

 Tre Williams

Amateur 

 Kyonosuke Yamashita

 Dylan Jaeb

 Filipe Mota

Former 
 Shane O’Neill

 Devine Calloway

 Nick Tucker

References 

Skateboarding companies